Andrea Dimitry (January 1775 – March 1, 1852), also known as Andrea Drussakis Dimitry, was a Greek refugee who migrated to New Orleans. He was a merchant and hero in the War of 1812. He married Marianne Céleste Dragon a Louisiana creole woman of African, French, and Greek ancestry. He fought in the Battle of New Orleans with Major General and future President Andrew Jackson. His son was the author and educator Alexander Dimitry.

Early life

Andrea Dimitry was born on the Island of Hydra. He was the son of Nicholas Dimitry and Euphrosine Antonia. The Dimitry family had originally lived on the mainland of Greece. They had fled to Hydra seeking refuge from the Turks. This is where Andrea was born. The family name Drussakis is common on the island.  Hydra was the victim of heavy tariffs and taxes. The Ottoman government limited free trade.  Only Ottoman vessels were permitted in the region.  A plague struck the island in 1792.  A large portion of the inhabitants were killed and many people moved away.  Andrea left the island around this time.   

After a long voyage and traveling all over the world Andrea eventually settled in the Spanish French New Orleans.  He arrived in New Orleans in the 1790s.  He met a prominent Greek man named Lieutenant Michel Dragon.  Dragon immigrated to New Orleans around 1760.  Dragon was a soldier in the Spanish Colonial Army.  Around 1764, when the Spanish took control of the Louisiana Territory. Dragon received a commission in the Spanish militia.  The American Revolution began and under Bernardo de Gálvez, Lieutenant Dragon served Spain and the United States of America in the war against Britain.  They defeated the British at the siege of Pensacola (1781) and conquered West Florida.  For his service, he attained the rank second lieutenant and received a Royal Appointment in 1792.   He had a relationship with a woman who was born to a slave.  Her name was Francoise Chauvin Beaulieu de Monpliaisir she had dark skin.  Their daughter Marianne Celeste was born in 1777.  Andrea met Dragon when he arrived in New Orleans.  Andrea married his daughter Marianne Celeste in 1799, she was listed as white on the marriage certificate.  The acquisition of the territory of Louisiana by the United States from France took place in 1803.  The family was officially American.

Life in America

 
Andrea and Marianne Celeste had ten children including educator and author Alexander Dimitry.  In the 1805 New Orleans City Directory, Michel Dragon and his wife resided at 60 Rue de Chartres.  Andrea Dimitry lived next door at 58 Rue de Chartres. The Street bordered Jackson Square in the French Quarter. The War of 1812 broke out and Andrea joined as a private and assisted Captain Frio Delabostris company, second cavaliers, Louisiana Militia.  He participated in the Battle of New Orleans assisting General Andrew Jackson.  He became an American hero and local legend.

Andrea Dimitry owned a store and Marianne Celeste Dragon inherited 1,000 acres of land. The land was situated on the Gulf Coast of Mississippi and Andrea built a villa there. Andrea's son Alexander Dimitry became highly educated. Alexander and some of his siblings attended Georgetown University.
     
By the age of ten, he was educated by private tutors, Alexander was fluent in classical Greek and Latin. He spoke English, French, Greek, Italian, and Spanish.  He eventually mastered eleven languages. At fifteen years old Alexander entered Georgetown University in Washington, D. C., he graduated in 1826 with high honors.  Andrea spared no expense educating his children.  His children were elite upper-class.

Alexander married Mary Powell Mills. Mills was the daughter of Robert Mills a distinguished architect. He was from Charleston, South Carolina, and the designer of the Washington Monument.  His father-in-law eventually became an abolitionist. The couple married in Washington D.C. on April 5, 1835.  They had ten children. Alexander became the first superintendent of schools in Louisiana.  He was also the first person of color to hold this position. 
      
Andrea's eldest daughter Euphrosyne Dimitry married Paul Pandely in New Orleans in 1822.  Paul was the son of Nicholas Pandeli a Greek who immigrated to England and married Elizabeth English.  Elizabeth was a member of the English royal family the House of Stuart.  They had four children.

Euphrosyne and Paul's son, George, ran for political office in New Orleans around 1854. His political opponent used his grandmother Marianne Celeste's African ethnicity as slander. This led to his immediate disqualification from holding office.  Around this time Alexander Dimitry also vacated his position as superintendent. The family, which was extremely politically connected, sued the opponent for slander and won.  Alexander later became the first person of color to represent the United States as ambassador to Costa Rica and Nicaragua.

Marianne vs. Andrea
 
Marianne Celeste inherited a sizable fortune from her father.  Don Miguel Dragon owned 1000 acres and dozens of slaves.  He officially married her mother  Francoise Chauvin Beaulieu de Monplaisir in 1815.  Seven years before they died. In February 1834, Marianne took Andrea to court for mismanaging the family assets. She won a settlement of $27,000 close to 1 million dollars adjusted for 2021 inflation.  By May, she sold off the remaining assets.  This lawsuit is remarkable because the court sided with a woman of color. There is a possibility Andrea was having an affair with Irene a 29-year-old slave.  She was sold along with her mulatto son Gustave. He was 10 years old.  The two were sold as part of the legal proceedings. There is no record that Andrea and Marianne obtained a divorce. Marianne was fifty-seven and Andrea was fifty-nine.

Death and legacy

Andrea died in 1852 he was 77 years old. He was given a veteran's funeral. A special military detachment of the Washington Artillery appeared at the family's cottage.  Several military officers and civilians gathered and many people from New Orleans attended his service.  The military fired cannons, muskets and a band played in his honor.  At the time there was a Greek vessel in New Orleans and the officers and crew in the port attended the funeral and the flags of the vessel were suspended half-mast.  His wife and soul mate died four years later in 1856, she was about 78 years old.

Andrea and Marianne Céleste had ten children:  Euphrosine, Mannella Airnée, Alexander, Constantine Andrea, John Baptiste Miguel Dracos, Clino Angelica, Marie Francesca Athenais, Nicholas Dimitry, Mathilde Elizabeth Theophanie, and Antonie Marie.  Seventy percent of his children married foreigners.  The ethnicities were Greek, French and Italian.  They were all Greek-American.

Andrea Dimitry's, children, grandchildren, great-grandchildren, and in-laws, were an elite New Orleans family. They also became a notable political Greek-American creole family.

See also
Anti-miscegenation laws in the United States
Zephaniah Kingsley
Marie Laveau

References

1775 births
1852 deaths
19th-century American military personnel
American slave owners
Interracial marriage in the United States
People of the War of 1812
American militiamen in the War of 1812
Battle of New Orleans
People from Hydra (island)
Greek emigrants to the United States
19th-century Greek Americans
19th-century Greek people
People from New Orleans
18th-century Greek Americans
18th-century Greek people
18th-century Greek businesspeople
19th-century Greek businesspeople